The 2012 Asian Men's Softball Championship was an international softball tournament which featured six nations which was held from 25–28 October 2012 in Niimi, Japan.

Participants

References

Asian Men's Softball Championship
International softball competitions hosted by Japan
2012 in Japanese sport